The City of Oxford High School for Boys (a.k.a. Oxford High School for Boys and City of Oxford School) was founded in 1881 by Thomas Hill Green to provide Oxford boys with an education which would enable them to prepare for University.

History
It was administered by the City of Oxford Education Committee, with around 400 boys enrolled. The school finally closed in 1966, when it was combined with what was then Southfield Grammar School to form a grammar school, known as Oxford School at that time (the present Oxford Spires Academy).

The building
The Victorian stone building, bearing the arms of both the City and University, was designed by Sir Thomas Jackson in Oxford, England, and still stands at the corner of George Street and New Inn Hall Street. Additional classrooms were later added in the playground, a space that was contained on the south side by an extensive length of the city's mediaeval wall. The school remained here until 1966, when it moved to the Southfield Grammar School site (now occupied by Oxford Spires Academy) in Glanville Road off Cowley Road. The George Street building for some years housed the Classics Department of Oxford University, but was transferred to the History Faculty in the summer of 2007.

The school's playing fields were in North Oxford, along and beside Marston Ferry Road and which later housed the Old Boy's Rugby Club.

Inscription
The George Street building has the following inscription on it:

Thomas Hill Green (1832–82). Educationalist, Fellow of Balliol, White's Professor of Moral Philosophy, elected (1876) first University Member of Oxford City Council to help found and establish the High School for Boys (1881–1966), thereby completing the city's 'ladder of learning' from elementary school to university—
A project dearest to his heart.
Thus were united town and gown in common cause.

The staff
During the late 1940s, the headmaster was F. C. ("Freddy") Lay (a plaque to him is sited on the back of the New George Street Building as he was the first old boy to become head); he was succeeded by Mr R. W. Bodey in 1962.

Headmasters
 1881–8 Arthur Pollard
 1888–1925 Arthur Cave
 1925–32 Wilfrid Parkinson

School tradition 
The school motto "Labor Vincit Omnia" ('tis work that conquers all) was carved above the prefects' door, and became the basis for the school song that every boy knew by heart:

In tranquil days of long ago
Under good Victoria's rule
Their faith in Oxford's youth to show
Our grandsires built a school.
"Labor Vincit Omnia"
Tis work that conquers all.
This gem of ancient Roman lore
Was carved above the prefects' door.
"Nemo Repente Sapit", too, 
Was there beside it in full view, 
Reminding those of slower pace 
That perseverance wins the race. 
Labor Vincit Omnia 
Labor Vincit Omnia 

Each November, the School Speech Day took place in Oxford Town Hall. First there was a church service in St Mary's Church on the High Street in the morning, then the main event in the afternoon started with a procession of staff in academic robes and hoods. In December, there was a school carol service in the University Church.

The boy's blazers were chocolate brown, as were the caps. In later years Sixth formers wore blue blazers. The striped tie was brown with red and blue diagonal piping. On entry to the school, every boy became a member of one of the four school houses: Lawrence, Jolliffe, Kerry or Salter.

Legacy
The former pupils of the City of Oxford High School now have their own Old Boys Association, called the City of Oxford School Association (COSA).

Following the merger of the Oxford High School for Boys, and many changes (including loss of grammar school status, a switch to coeducation and becoming a Foundation School), there remains a school at the Glanville Road site: the Oxford Spires Academy.

Alumni

 Ronnie Barker, comedian.
 Dr Cyril Beeson, entomologist and antiquarian horologist.
 Prof. Rupert E. Billingham, Professor of Cell Biology from 1971 to 1986 at the University of Texas Southwestern Medical Center, did important early work with Sir Peter Medawar on organ transplantation, and President from 1974–6 of the Transplantation Society.
 Theodore William Chaundy, mathematician.
 Brian Cobby, voice of the British speaking clock.
 John Drinkwater, poet and playwright.
 Jack Gibbons, pianist and composer.
 Arthur Hawes, Archdeacon of Lincoln.
 Rt. Rev. Alan Hopes, Roman Catholic Bishop of East Anglia. 
 The Baron Hunt of Kings Heath, OBE, Labour peer and former Minister in DEFRA and the DECC, and President from 1998–9 of the Family Planning Association.
 Tony Juniper, campaigner, writer, and environmentalist. 
 Professor The Baron Krebs, Principal since 2005 of Jesus College, Oxford, and President from 1993–4 of the Association for the Study of Animal Behaviour.
 Col. T. E. Lawrence, better known as 'Lawrence of Arabia', and his youngest brother Prof. A. W. Lawrence, Laurence Professor of Classical Archaeology at Cambridge University.
 Ken Messer, watercolourist and draughtsman.
 The 1st Baron Salter, British politician and academic, Member of Parliament 1937–1950 and 1951–1953
 Rt. Rev. Russell Berridge White, Bishop of Tonbridge from 1959 to 1968.
 Heinz Wolff, scientist.

One of the four school houses was named after Lawrence. Large photographs of Lawrence and Drinkwater were displayed to the right and left of the main hall, to inspire pupils during morning assembly – Lawrence is now above the main staircase.

References

External links
 City of Oxford High School, George Street, Oxford
 City of Oxford School Association website

Boys' schools in Oxfordshire
Educational institutions established in 1881
Educational institutions disestablished in 1966
Schools in Oxford
History of Oxford
Defunct grammar schools in England
Defunct schools in Oxfordshire
1881 establishments in England
1966 disestablishments in England